FK Admira Prague is a Czech football club located in Prague-Kobylisy, Czech Republic. It currently plays in the Bohemian Football League, which is the third level of competition in the country. They played two seasons in the Bohemian Football League, but were relegated in the 2014–15 season, then promoted back for 2015–16. The biggest rival of this club is FK Meteor Prague VIII.

Reserves
Admira's reserve team plays in Prague Championship.

Honours
Czech Fourth Division
 Champions 2012–13
Prague Championship (fifth tier)
 Champions 2005–06

References

External links

  
 FK Admira Prague at the website of the Prague Football Association 
 Stadium at soccerway.com

Football clubs in the Czech Republic
Football clubs in Prague
Association football clubs established in 1909
1909 establishments in Austria-Hungary